Adrian Wilson (1923 – 1988) was an American book designer, and author of the influential 1967 work entitled, The Design of Books.

Early life and education
Adrian Wilson was born on 1 July 1923 in Ann Arbor, Michigan, and raised in Beverly, Massachusetts. He attended Wesleyan University, only briefly. He left college to join the war resistance movement, where he learned about book design and graphic design. During World War II he was interned at Camp Angel in Waldport, Oregon where he printed William Everson's anti-war poems for Untide Press.

After the war he and his new wife, Joyce Lancaster Wilson, settled in San Francisco and helped to form the Interplayers Theater.

In 1947 he studied architecture at the University of California, Berkeley, but soon left, first to join Jack Stauffacher at the Greenwood Press, and afterwards to join the University of California Press.

Career 
After a few years he left the Press, but he accepted commissions from them for many years. In 1957 appeared his Printing for Theatre. One of his apprentices was printmaker Peter Rutledge Koch.

In 1958 he sold his press and he and his wife began a tour of Europe, where they met Will Carter, John Dreyfus, Hermann Zapf, Stanley Morison, Beatrice Warde and Giovanni Mardersteig. In 1983 he was an early recipient of a MacArthur Foundation award.

He developed an interest in early book illustration, leading to his The Making of the Nuremberg Chronicle (1976), and (with his wife) A Medieval Mirror (1984), an account of early printed editions of the Speculum Humanae Salvationis.

He died of congestive heart failure on 3 February 1988 in a hospital in San Francisco.

References

Further reading
 Peter Rutledge Koch, "Three Philosophical Printers  William Everson, Jack Stauffacher, and Adrian Wilson", in Parenthesis, 19 (2010 Autumn), pp. 12–17.

External links
Douglas C. McGill, "Adrian Wilson, 64, A Printing Teacher and Book Designer", The New York Times, 6 February 1988.
Guide to the Adrian Wilson Papers at The Bancroft Library

1923 births
1988 deaths
MacArthur Fellows
Book designers
University of California, Berkeley alumni